Fantasy 4ever is the second Mandarin studio album of Taiwanese Mandopop quartet boy band F4. It was released on 18 December 2002 by Sony Music Taiwan. It includes a VCD which contains two music videos.

The album is organized in the style of a split album with two tracks by Vic, one track each by the other remaining members, a duet by Vanness and Ken and six tracks collectively as F4. It features "絕不能失去你" (Can't Lose You) for the opening theme and "煙火的季節" (Season of Fireworks) for the ending theme of the 2002 Taiwanese drama series Meteor Garden II respectively; and the Pepsi advertisement theme song "Ask For More" and a Mandarin version of Walt Disney's Lilo & Stitch theme song, "Can't Help Falling in Love".

The album was awarded one of the Top 10 Selling Mandarin Albums of the Year at the 2003 IFPI Hong Kong Album Sales Awards, presented by the Hong Kong branch of IFPI. The album achieved commercial success in Indonesia, having sold over 100,000 copies within two weeks of its official release.

Track listing
 絕不能失去你 (Can't Lose You)
 煙火的季節 (Season of Fireworks)
 愛的領域 (Love's Terrain)
 一個人的冬季 (Lonely Winter)
 晴天 (One Fine Day)
 當你的朋友 (You As A Friend)
 Te Amo 我愛你 (Te Amo I Love You) - version of Chayanne
 只有我 (Only I)
 心理測驗 (Psychological Test)
 怎麼會是你	(How Come It's You)
 Ask For More
 Can't Help Falling in Love

Music videos
 "Ask For More" MV
 "Can't Help Falling in Love" MV
 "絕不能失去你" (Can't Lose You) MV
 "煙火的季節" (Season of Fireworks) MV
 "愛的領域" (Love's Terrain) MV
 "Te Amo 我愛你" (I Love You) MV

Release
Fantasy 4ever was released in Taiwan on 18 December 2002. In the Philippines, the album was released in June 2003.

References

2002 albums
F4 (band) albums
Sony Music Taiwan albums